The meridian 123° east of Greenwich is a line of longitude that extends from the North Pole across the Arctic Ocean, Asia, the Pacific Ocean, the Indian Ocean, Australia, the Southern Ocean, and Antarctica to the South Pole.

The 123rd meridian east forms a great circle with the 57th meridian west.

From Pole to Pole
Starting at the North Pole and heading south to the South Pole, the 123rd meridian east passes through:

{| class="wikitable plainrowheaders"
! scope="col" width="130" | Co-ordinates
! scope="col" | Country, territory or sea
! scope="col" | Notes
|-
| style="background:#b0e0e6;" | 
! scope="row" style="background:#b0e0e6;" | Arctic Ocean
| style="background:#b0e0e6;" |
|-
| style="background:#b0e0e6;" | 
! scope="row" style="background:#b0e0e6;" | Laptev Sea
| style="background:#b0e0e6;" |
|-valign="top"
| 
! scope="row" | 
| Sakha Republic Amur Oblast — from 
|-valign="top"
| 
! scope="row" | 
| Heilongjiang Inner Mongolia — from  Heilongjiang — from  Inner Mongolia — from  Jilin — from  Inner Mongolia — from  Liaoning — from 
|-valign="top"
| style="background:#b0e0e6;" | 
! scope="row" style="background:#b0e0e6;" | Yellow Sea
| style="background:#b0e0e6;" | Passing just east of the Shandong Peninsula, Shandong,  (at )
|-valign="top"
| style="background:#b0e0e6;" | 
! scope="row" style="background:#b0e0e6;" | East China Sea
| style="background:#b0e0e6;" | Passing just east of the Zhoushan archipelago, Zhejiang,  (at )
|-
| 
! scope="row" | 
| Okinawa Prefecture — island of Yonaguni
|-
| style="background:#b0e0e6;" | 
! scope="row" style="background:#b0e0e6;" | Pacific Ocean
| style="background:#b0e0e6;" | Philippine Sea
|-
| 
! scope="row" | 
| Island of Luzon
|-
| style="background:#b0e0e6;" | 
! scope="row" style="background:#b0e0e6;" | Ragay Gulf
| style="background:#b0e0e6;" |
|-
| 
! scope="row" | 
| Island of Burias
|-
| style="background:#b0e0e6;" | 
! scope="row" style="background:#b0e0e6;" | Sibuyan Sea
| style="background:#b0e0e6;" |
|-
| 
! scope="row" | 
| Island of Panay
|-
| style="background:#b0e0e6;" | 
! scope="row" style="background:#b0e0e6;" | Guimaras Strait
| style="background:#b0e0e6;" |
|-
| 
! scope="row" | 
| Island of Negros
|-
| style="background:#b0e0e6;" | 
! scope="row" style="background:#b0e0e6;" | Sulu Sea
| style="background:#b0e0e6;" |
|-
| 
! scope="row" | 
| Island of Mindanao
|-
| style="background:#b0e0e6;" | 
! scope="row" style="background:#b0e0e6;" | Celebes Sea
| style="background:#b0e0e6;" |
|-
| 
! scope="row" | 
| Island of Sulawesi (Minahassa Peninsula)
|-
| style="background:#b0e0e6;" | 
! scope="row" style="background:#b0e0e6;" | Gulf of Tomini
| style="background:#b0e0e6;" |
|-
| 
! scope="row" | 
| Island of Sulawesi (East Peninsula)
|-
| style="background:#b0e0e6;" | 
! scope="row" style="background:#b0e0e6;" | Peleng Straits
| style="background:#b0e0e6;" |
|-
| 
! scope="row" | 
| Island of Peleng
|-
| style="background:#b0e0e6;" | 
! scope="row" style="background:#b0e0e6;" | Banda Sea
| style="background:#b0e0e6;" | Passing just west of the island of Manui,  (at )
|-
| 
! scope="row" | 
| Island of Wowoni
|-
| style="background:#b0e0e6;" | 
! scope="row" style="background:#b0e0e6;" | Banda Sea
| style="background:#b0e0e6;" | Passing just east of the island of Sulawesi,  (at )
|-
| 
! scope="row" | 
| Island of Buton
|-
| style="background:#b0e0e6;" | 
! scope="row" style="background:#b0e0e6;" | Banda Sea
| style="background:#b0e0e6;" |
|-
| 
! scope="row" | 
| Island of Buton
|-
| style="background:#b0e0e6;" | 
! scope="row" style="background:#b0e0e6;" | Banda Sea
| style="background:#b0e0e6;" |
|-
| 
! scope="row" | 
| Islands of Flores, Adonara and Solor
|-
| style="background:#b0e0e6;" | 
! scope="row" style="background:#b0e0e6;" | Savu Sea
| style="background:#b0e0e6;" |
|-
| 
! scope="row" | 
| Island of Rote
|-
| style="background:#b0e0e6;" | 
! scope="row" style="background:#b0e0e6;" | Indian Ocean
| style="background:#b0e0e6;" |
|-
| 
! scope="row" | 
| Ashmore and Cartier Islands
|-
| style="background:#b0e0e6;" | 
! scope="row" style="background:#b0e0e6;" | Indian Ocean
| style="background:#b0e0e6;" |
|-
| 
! scope="row" | 
| Western Australia
|-
| style="background:#b0e0e6;" | 
! scope="row" style="background:#b0e0e6;" | Indian Ocean
| style="background:#b0e0e6;" | Australian authorities consider this to be part of the Southern Ocean
|-
| style="background:#b0e0e6;" | 
! scope="row" style="background:#b0e0e6;" | Southern Ocean
| style="background:#b0e0e6;" |
|-valign="top"
| 
! scope="row" | Antarctica
| Australian Antarctic Territory, claimed by 
|-
|}

See also
122nd meridian east
124th meridian east

References

e123 meridian east